Kin Yamei (1864 – March 4, 1934) also seen as Chin Ya-mei or Jin Yunmei, or anglicized as Y. May King, was a Chinese-born, American-raised doctor, hospital administrator, educator, and nutrition expert. She is credited with introducing tofu to the United States Department of Agriculture (USDA) during World War I.

Early life
Kin Yamei was born in 1864, in Ningbo. Her father, Rev. Kying Ling-yiu (Chin Ding-yu), was a Christian convert. When she was two years old she was orphaned during the cholera epidemic; she was adopted by American missionaries, Divie Bethune McCartee and Juana M. Knight McCartee. They encouraged her to use her given name, and to learn Chinese as well as English; she also learned to speak Japanese and French. She attended the Women's Medical College of the New York Infirmary, founded by Elizabeth Blackwell, where she graduated at the top of her class in 1885. She was the first Chinese woman to receive a medical degree in the United States in 1888. The Chinese Consul attended the graduation ceremony to witness her achievement. She pursued further study in Philadelphia and Washington, D. C.   She also learned photography skills, and published a journal article on medical photo-micrography while she was in medical school.

Career

From 1890 to 1894, she ran a hospital for women and children in Kobe, Japan, where she stayed while recovering from malaria.  She was superintendent at a women's hospital and nurses' training program at Tientsin. She also founded the Northern Medical School for Women at Zhili, in 1907.

She also lectured in the United States about Chinese culture, women, and medicine, including a speech to the Los Angeles Medical Association, and a speech at Carnegie Hall. She published an article about Honolulu's Chinatown in Overland Monthly (1902), and an article about soybeans in the New-York Tribune (1904). She spent World War I in the United States, working with the USDA on nutritional and other uses for soybeans, and introducing tofu to American food scientists. She addressed an international Peace Conference in 1904, in New York City.

Personal life
Kin Yamei married Hippolytus Laesola Amador Eca da Silva, in 1894 in Japan. Mr. da Silva was a merchant and interpreter born in Hong Kong. They divorced in 1904. They had a son, Alexander, born in 1895 in Honolulu, Hawaii; he died in 1918 as an American soldier in World War I, in France, and was buried at Arlington National Cemetery, under the name "Alexander A. Kin". Kin Yamei returned to China and spent her later years in Beijing, and died from pneumonia in 1934, aged 70 years.

References

External links
Overlooked No More: Yamei Kin, the Chinese Doctor Who Introduced Tofu to the West – The New York Times
Biographical information about Kin Yamei at the Soy Info Center.
James Kay MacGregor, "Yamei Kin and her Mission to the Chinese People", The Craftsman 9 November 1905): 242-249.

1864 births
1934 deaths
Scientists from Ningbo
Chinese women physicians
Chinese physicians
Women in World War I
Chinese expatriates in the United States
Physicians from Zhejiang
Qing dynasty people